The Coupe du Burkina Faso is the top knockout football tournament in Burkina Faso.

Winners

Titles by club

References
Burkina Faso – List of Cup Winners, RSSSF.com

Football competitions in Burkina Faso
Burkinabe